= Kansai College of Oriental Medicine =

- 関西鍼灸短期大学
- Type: Private
- Active: 1985–2005
- President: Yoshiro Yatsuse
- Location: Japan
- Website: https://www.kansai.ac.jp

Kansai College of Oriental Medicine (関西鍼灸短期大学, Kansai Shinkyu Tanki Daigaku) is a junior college in Osaka, Japan, and is part of the Kansai Iryo Gakuen network.

The institute was founded in 1957 and was established as a Junior College in 1985.
